First Presbyterian Church of Jefferson, also known as Maple Museum, is a historic Presbyterian church located in Jefferson, Schoharie County, New York.  It was built in 1837, and is a two-story, heavy timber frame, Greek Revival style meeting house style church.  It has a front gable roof, flush board siding, and Doric order pediment and entablature.  The front facade features a square staged bell tower.  The church closed in 1919, and has since been used as a school, American Legion hall, and most recently as a community center and local history museum.

It was listed on the National Register of Historic Places in 2012.

References

History museums in New York (state)
Presbyterian churches in New York (state)
Churches on the National Register of Historic Places in New York (state)
Greek Revival church buildings in New York (state)
Churches completed in 1837
Churches in Schoharie County, New York
National Register of Historic Places in Schoharie County, New York